18-22 Kent Street is a heritage-listed row of three terrace houses located at 18, 20 and 22 Kent Street, in the inner city Sydney suburb of Millers Point in the City of Sydney local government area of New South Wales, Australia. It was added to the New South Wales State Heritage Register on 2 April 1999.

History 
Millers Point is one of the earliest areas of European settlement in Australia, and a focus for maritime activities. 18-22 Kent Street is terrace housing built during the 1860s. It was first tenanted by NSW Department of Housing in 1982.

Description 
A two-storey Victorian Filigree terrace house with three bedrooms. Features include painted stuccoed masonry, a cantilevered balcony over footpath, cast iron balustrade and verandah supports, a corrugated iron verandah, two french doors with fanlights on upper storey, fanlight over front door and a sash window with slab sill on ground floor.

Heritage listing 
This 1860s terrace forms part of a cohesive streetscape element.

It is part of the Millers Point Conservation Area, an intact residential and maritime precinct. It contains residential buildings and civic spaces dating from the 1830s and is an important example of nineteenth-century adaptation of the landscape.

18-22 Kent Street was listed on the New South Wales State Heritage Register on 2 April 1999.

See also 

Australian residential architectural styles

References

Bibliography

Attribution

External links

 

New South Wales State Heritage Register sites located in Millers Point
Kent Street, Millers Point, 18-22
Terraced houses in Sydney
Articles incorporating text from the New South Wales State Heritage Register
1860s establishments in Australia
Houses completed in the 19th century
Millers Point Conservation Area